Sancha of Portugal (2 February 1264 – 1279) was a Portuguese infanta, daughter of King Afonso III of Portugal and his second wife Beatrice of Castile.

Sancha was born on February 2, 1264. Little is known about her life. She travelled with her mother and sister Blanche to Seville where she died in 1279. In 1302, her remains were transferred to Portugal where she was buried at the Monastery of Alcobaça, Alcobaça.

Ancestry

References 

1264 births
1302 deaths
Portuguese infantas
House of Burgundy-Portugal
13th-century Portuguese people
13th-century Portuguese women
13th-century Castilians
13th-century Spanish women
Daughters of kings